Hanselman is a surname. Notable people with the surname include:

Hanselman sextuplets (born 2004)
Richard W. Hanselman (1927–2021), American businessman
W. Hanselman, Egyptian photographer

See also
Hanselmann